This list contains the top 50 accounts with the most followers on the social media platform Twitter. Barack Obama, Elon Musk, Justin Bieber, Katy Perry, Rihanna and Cristiano Ronaldo top the list, with over 100 million followers each.

Most followed accounts on Twitter 
The following table lists the top 50 most-followed accounts on Twitter, with each total rounded down to the nearest hundred thousand, as well as a description of each account.

The list includes, without ranking them, accounts that were suspended (by Twitter) or deactivated (by the user) while they had enough followers to be part of the top 50, such as Ariana Grande.

See also 

 List of most-retweeted tweets
 List of most-liked tweets
 List of most-followed Instagram accounts
 List of most-followed TikTok accounts
 List of most-followed Facebook pages
 List of most-subscribed YouTube channels
 List of most-subscribed YouTube Music artists
 List of most-viewed YouTube videos
 List of most-streamed artists on Spotify
 List of most-streamed songs on Spotify
 List of most-followed Twitch channels

References 

Lists of Internet-related superlatives
Most followed users
Most Followed Users
Twitter